Sarıyar is a small town in Nallıhan district of Ankara Province, Turkey. The population of Sarıyar was 876   as of 2011. According to mayor's page, the name of the town ("yellow cliff") refers to the landscape around Sarıyar. During the dam construction years in 1950s, the population of the town increased because of services to construction. In 1983, Sarıyar was declared a seat of township. Nevertheless the population has dropped since then. At the present the main economic activity is agriculture and the main crops are vegetables and grapes. With picnic areas around the dam and the tomb of Taptuk Emre, a 13th-century dervish in the nearby village of Emremsultan, tourism also plays some role in the town economy.

References

External links
 For images

Populated places in Ankara Province
Towns in Turkey
Nallıhan